Jason Winderlich (born 10 October 1984) is a former professional Australian rules footballer who played for the Essendon Football Club in the Australian Football League (AFL).

AFL career 
Originally from Thorpdale, Victoria, he was drafted in the first round of the 2002 AFL Draft from the Gippsland Power in the TAC Cup.

In June 2008, after playing 26 games in a season and a half, he underwent back surgery to repair a prolapsed disc, missing the rest of the year.  He returned the following season to have one of his best seasons, earning 10 Brownlow Medal votes to be the equal leader for Essendon and finishing fifth in the club's best and fairest award.

In round 4, 2011 Winderlich suffered a serious ACL injury which ended his 2011 season.

In August 2014, Winderlich announced he would retire at seasons end, however, after the end of the Essendon's finals campaign, it was publicly revealed that he was contemplating playing on. He managed only one match for 2015 due to a back injury, and announced his proper retirement in September.

Statistics

|- style="background-color: #EAEAEA"
! scope="row" style="text-align:center" | 2003
|  || 8 || 3 || 2 || 0 || 11 || 7 || 18 || 7 || 6 || 0.7 || 0.0 || 3.7 || 2.3 || 6.0 || 2.3 || 2.0
|- 
! scope="row" style="text-align:center" | 2004
|  || 8 || 6 || 1 || 1 || 23 || 15 || 38 || 14 || 10 || 0.2 || 0.2 || 3.8 || 2.5 || 6.3 || 2.3 || 1.7
|- style="background-color: #EAEAEA"
! scope="row" style="text-align:center" | 2005
|  || 8 || 12 || 4 || 2 || 59 || 54 || 113 || 35 || 19 || 0.3 || 0.2 || 4.9 || 4.5 || 9.4 || 2.9 || 1.6
|- 
! scope="row" style="text-align:center" | 2006
|  || 8 || 9 || 3 || 0 || 58 || 47 || 105 || 49 || 18 || 0.3 || 0.0 || 6.4 || 5.2 || 11.7 || 5.4 || 2.0
|- style="background-color: #EAEAEA"
! scope="row" style="text-align:center" | 2007
|  || 8 || 17 || 6 || 6 || 190 || 130 || 320 || 132 || 40 || 0.4 || 0.4 || 11.2 || 7.6 || 18.8 || 7.8 || 2.4
|-
! scope="row" style="text-align:center" | 2008
|  || 8 || 9 || 5 || 2 || 81 || 74 || 155 || 44 || 20 || 0.6 || 0.2 || 9.0 || 8.2 || 17.2 || 4.9 || 2.2
|- style="background-color: #EAEAEA"
! scope="row" style="text-align:center" | 2009
|  || 8 || 19 || 17 || 8 || 191 || 196 || 387 || 122 || 81 || 0.9 || 0.4 || 10.0 || 10.3 || 20.4 || 6.4 || 4.3
|-
! scope="row" style="text-align:center" | 2010
|  || 8 || 19 || 2 || 12 || 186 || 232 || 418 || 99 || 92 || 0.1 || 0.6 || 9.8 || 12.2 || 22.0 || 5.2 || 4.8
|- style="background-color: #EAEAEA"
! scope="row" style="text-align:center" | 2011
|  || 8 || 4 || 6 || 0 || 19 || 26 || 45 || 10 || 8 || 1.5 || 0.0 || 4.8 || 6.5 || 11.2 || 2.5 || 2.0
|-
! scope="row" style="text-align:center" | 2012
|  || 8 || 2 || 5 || 0 || 14 || 8 || 22 || 10 || 4 || 2.5 || 0.0 || 7.0 || 4.0 || 11.0 || 5.0 || 2.0
|- style="background-color: #EAEAEA"
! scope="row" style="text-align:center" | 2013
|  || 8 || 12 || 17 || 8 || 103 || 74 || 177 || 79 || 30 || 1.4 || 0.7 || 8.6 || 6.2 || 14.8 || 6.6 || 2.5
|-
! scope="row" style="text-align:center" | 2014
|  || 8 || 16 || 15 || 8 || 123 || 110 || 233 || 75 || 35 || 0.9 || 0.5 || 7.7 || 6.9 || 14.6 || 4.7 || 2.2
|- style="background-color: #EAEAEA"
! scope="row" style="text-align:center" | 2015
|  || 8 || 1 || 0 || 0 || 2 || 4 || 6 || 1 || 3 || 0.0 || 0.0 || 2.0 || 4.0 || 6.0 || 1.0 || 3.0
|- class="sortbottom"
! colspan=3| Career
! 129
! 83
! 47
! 1060
! 977
! 2037
! 677
! 366
! 0.6
! 0.4
! 8.2
! 7.6
! 15.8
! 5.2
! 2.8
|}

References

External links

Essendon Football Club players
1984 births
Living people
Australian rules footballers from Victoria (Australia)
Gippsland Power players
Bendigo Football Club players